John Morgan Greene (22 September 1928 – 22 October 2007) was an American theoretical physicist and applied mathematician, known for his work on solitons and plasma physics.

Education
After several successes as a high school student in the state mathematical competitions of Kansas, he received a Pepsi Cola scholarship at Caltech, where he earned a B. S. in 1950. In 1956 he received a PhD from the University of Rochester in nuclear physics under David Feldman with a thesis entitled "High-Order Corrections to the Nucleon-Nucleon Potential in Change-Symmetric Pseudoscalar Theory."

Career and research
After  his PhD, he worked at the Princeton Plasma Physics Laboratory (on "Project Matterhorn"), where he was one of the leading theoretical physicists and remained until 1982. In 1982 he was Senior Technical Advisor in the theory group of General Atomics and simultaneously adjunct professor at the University of California, San Diego.

He was the author of a series of works with John Johnson and Katherine Weimer on equilibria and instabilities in Tokamak and Stellarator plasmas in magnetohydrodynamics. With Johnson and Ray Grimm he developed the computer program PEST (Princeton Equilibrium and Stability in Tokamak's Code). With Bruno Coppi and others he investigated dissipative instabilities in plasmas. With Ira B. Bernstein and Martin Kruskal he did research on BGK modes (nonlinear wave solutions in plasma physics). In the 1970s he worked on Hamiltonian dynamics in chaos theory. In 1979 he published Greene's criterion for the collapse of tori in KAM theory.

Awards and honors
In 1992, he won the James Clerk Maxwell Prize for Plasma Physics. He was a fellow of the American Physical Society (APS) and a member of the American Geophysical Union.

In 2006, he received the Leroy P. Steele Prize with Martin Kruskal, Robert M. Miura and Clifford S. Gardner for his work on inverse scattering transformations in the theory of solitons.

Personal life
He was married from 1956 on and had a daughter and two grandchildren. He died as a consequence of Parkinson's disease. Greene's father was a professor of chemical engineering at Kansas State.

References 

1928 births
2007 deaths
20th-century American physicists
California Institute of Technology alumni
University of Rochester alumni
University of California, San Diego faculty
Fellows of the American Physical Society